"Off 2 Work" is the sixth single from British rapper, Dizzee Rascal, a double A-side with "Graftin'", which was contained on Dizzee Rascal's second album Showtime.

The accompanying music video featured Dizzee Rascal in various ordinary workplace situations (as a policeman, a fast food vendor, a businessman, etc.) and as Prime Minister, announcing his engagement to Cherie Blair.

"Off 2 Work" is not contained on any Dizzee Rascal studio album and is a stand-alone single release. The song became his lowest charting single to date and his first to miss the top 40, peaking at number 44, despite being previously unreleased.

Track listing
CD 1
 "Off 2 Work"
 "Graftin'"

CD 2
 "Off 2 Work"
 "Off 2 Work" (remix)
 "Graftin'" (video)

Vinyl
 "Off 2 Work"
 "Off 2 Work" (instrumental)
 "Off 2 Work" (remix)
 "Off 2 Work" (remix instrumental)

Charts

References

2004 songs
2005 singles
Dizzee Rascal songs
XL Recordings singles
Songs written by Dizzee Rascal